The Claremont Institute is a conservative think tank based in Upland, California. The institute was founded in 1979 by four students of Harry V. Jaffa. It produces the Claremont Review of Books, The American Mind, and other publications.

The institute was an early defender of Donald Trump. After Joe Biden won the 2020 election and Trump refused to concede while making claims of fraud, Claremont Institute senior fellow John Eastman aided Trump in his failed attempts to overturn the election results.

History
The institute was founded in 1979 by four students of Straussian political theorist Harry V. Jaffa, a professor emeritus at Claremont McKenna College and the Claremont Graduate University, although the institute has no affiliation with any of the Claremont Colleges. Under Jaffa and Larry P. Arnn, the institute became a leading Straussian-influenced conservative think tank, publishing on topics such as statesmanship, Lincoln scholarship and modern conservative issues.

Arnn served as its president from 1985 until 2000, when he became the twelfth president of Hillsdale College. Michael Pack was president from 2015 to 2017. Ryan Williams was named president in 2017.

The Claremont Institute publishes The Claremont Review of Books, The American Mind, The American Story Podcast and Claremont Books. The Washington, D.C., branch of the Claremont Institute, called the Center for the American Way of Life, opened in February 2021.

The Claremont Institute provides fellowships. Fellowships in the past have gone to prominent figures on the right such as Laura Ingraham, Ben Shapiro, Mark Levin, Mary Kissel, and Charles C. Johnson. The institute caused controversy by granting a fellowship in 2019 to the Pizzagate conspiracy theorist Jack Posobiec. National Review columnist Mona Charen wrote that "Claremont stands out for beclowning itself with this embrace of the smarmy underside of American politics." In 2020, Mark Joseph Stern of Slate magazine called the institute "a racist fever swamp with deep connections to the conspiratorial alt-right", citing Posobiec's fellowship and the publication of a 2020 essay by senior fellow John Eastman that questioned Kamala Harris' eligibility for the vice presidency.  In 2022, the American Mind published an editorial by Raw Egg Nationalist, an author affiliated with neo-Nazi publishing house Antelope Hill.

Trump advocacy and connections 
The institute was an early defender of Donald Trump. The Daily Beast stated Claremont "arguably has done more than any other group to build a philosophical case for Trump’s brand of conservatism."

In September 2016 the institute's Claremont Review of Books published Michael Anton's "The Flight 93 Election" editorial. The editorial, written under a pseudonym, compared the prospect of conservatives letting Trump lose to Hillary Clinton in the 2016 presidential election with passengers not charging the cockpit of the United Airlines aircraft hijacked by Al-Qaeda. The article went viral and received widespread coverage across the political spectrum. Rush Limbaugh devoted a day of his radio series to reading the entire essay. Anton would go on to serve under President Trump as spokesman for the National Security Council, holding the position from 2017 to 2018.

The institute became a significant player in the Trump administration, adding a Washington office and contributing ideas and personnel to the administration. In 2019, Trump awarded the Claremont Institute with a National Humanities Medal. In June 2020, former Claremont Institute president Michael Pack became head of the U.S. Agency for Global Media (USAGM) under Trump.

During the 2020 COVID-19 pandemic, the institute received between $350,000 and $1 million in federally backed small business loans from Chain Bridge Bank as part of the Paycheck Protection Program. The institute stated this would allow it to retain 29 jobs.

According to a November 4, 2021 Vice article, the actions of pro-Trump Claremont Institute leaderssenior fellows John Eastman,  Brian Kennedy, Angelo Codevilla, and Michael Anton, as well as Ryan Williams, the institute's president, and Thomas Klingenstein, chairman of the boardculminated in the January 6 attack on the Capitol. Williams has stated that the institute's mission "is to save western civilization." Vice asserts that Codevilla, who frequently denounced the "ruling class," coined the term "cold civil war" in 2017. On January 5, using the hashtag #HoldTheLine, Claremont president emeritus Brian Kennedy tweeted from Capitol Hill: "We are in a constitutional crisis and also in a revolutionary moment...We must embrace the spirit of the American Revolution to stop this communist revolution." In early January 2021, along with Trump and other advisors, Eastman unsuccessfully attempted  to persuade then-vice president Mike Pence to overturn the 2020 presidential election results. He then spoke at Trump's rally on January 6, 2021, before the attack on the Capitol. The details of Eastman's attempt, described in a book by journalists Bob Woodward and Robert Costa, made national headlines in September 2021.

Shortly afterward, the American Political Science Association canceled panels involving Eastman and Claremont at its 2021 conference. In April 2022 Thomas B. Edsall of the New York Times wrote in a guest essay that the Claremont Institute, as well as the institute's magazine American Mind and other publications, comprised the "substantial intellectual infrastructure that has buoyed the Trumpist right and its willingness to rupture moral codes and to discard traditional norms." An anonymous former fellow said Eastman's ideas are based on the doctrine of natural rights, which has been a key element of the institute's politics for many years. He said "That’s how Claremont goes from this quirky intellectual outfit to one of the main intellectual architects of trying to overthrow the republic."  Senior fellow Charles Kesler, who believes Eastman's advice was wrong, said the institute is split between "some who continue to believe that the election was stolen and some who have denied that from the beginning."

Biden years 
In 2021, Claremont senior fellow Glenn Ellmers wrote a controversial essay in Claremont's The American Mind arguing that the United States had been destroyed by internal enemies and that a "counter-revolution" was necessary to defeat the majority of the people who "can no longer be considered fellow citizens”. According to Ellmers, "Most people living in the United States today—certainly more than half—are not Americans in any meaningful sense of the term."

Williams, the institute's president, said its mission is to "save Western civilization", particularly from the threat he said is posed by the progressive movement.

Publications 
The Claremont Institute publishes the Claremont Review of Books. The CRB is edited by Charles R. Kesler and features regular columns by Martha Bayles, Mark Helprin, Michael Anton and Spencer Klavan. The institute also publishes The American Mind. Claremont Vice President of Education Matt Peterson serves as editor; and James Poulos is executive editor. The publication has featured essays by Newt Gingrich, Sen. Todd Young, Sen. Marco Rubio, Rep. Jim Banks, and Sen. Tom Cotton.

See also

 Claremont McKenna College
 Claremont Graduate University

References

External links

Foreign policy and strategy think tanks in the United States
Political and economic think tanks in the United States
Organizations established in 1979
Non-profit organizations based in California
Conservative organizations in the United States
National Humanities Medal recipients